Amyatt is a surname. Notable people with the surname include:

James Amyatt (1734–1813), British MP
John Amyatt, English chemist

See also
Myatt